There were twelve special elections to the United States House of Representatives in 1913, during the 62nd United States Congress and 63rd United States Congress.

62nd United States Congress 

|-
| 
| Joseph Taylor Robinson
|  | Democratic
| 1902
|  | Incumbent resigned January 14, 1913 to become Governor of Arkansas.New member elected January 15, 1913, having already been elected to the next term.Democratic hold.
| nowrap | 

|}

63rd United States Congress 

|-
| 
| John W. Weeks
|  | Republican
| 1902
|  | Incumbent resigned March 4, 1913, when elected U.S. Senator.New member elected April 15, 1913.Democratic gain.
| nowrap | 

|-
| 
| Albert S. Burleson
|  | Democratic
| 1898
|  | Incumbent resigned March 6, 1913 to become U.S. Postmaster General.New member elected April 15, 1913.Democratic hold.
| nowrap | 

|-
| 
| George S. Legaré
|  | Democratic
| 1902
|  | Incumbent member-elect died January 31, 1913.New member elected April 29, 1913.Democratic gain.
| nowrap | 

|-
| 
| Lewis J. Martin
|  | Democratic
| 1912
|  | Incumbent died May 5, 1913.New member elected July 22, 1913.Democratic hold.
| nowrap | 

|-
| 
| Forrest Goodwin
|  | Republican
| 1912
|  | Incumbent died May 28, 1913.New member elected September 9, 1913.Republican hold.
| nowrap | 

|-
| 
| John W. Davis
|  | Democratic
| 1910
|  | Incumbent resigned August 29, 1913 to become U.S. Solicitor General.New member elected October 14, 1913.Democratic hold.
| nowrap | 

|-
| 
| Seaborn Roddenbery
|  | Democratic
| 1910 
|  | Incumbent died September 25, 1913.New member elected November 4, 1913.Democratic hold.
| nowrap | 

|-
| 
| George Konig
|  | Democratic
| 1910
|  | Incumbent died May 31, 1913.New member elected November 4, 1913.Democratic hold.
| nowrap | 

|-
| 
| William Wilder
|  | Republican
| 1910
|  | Incumbent died September 11, 1913.New member elected November 4, 1913.Republican hold.
| nowrap | 

|-
| 
| Timothy Sullivan
|  | Democratic
| 19021903 1912
|  | Incumbent died August 31, 1913.New member elected November 4, 1913.Democratic hold.
| nowrap | 

|-
| 
| Francis B. Harrison
|  | Democratic
| 19021904 1906
|  | Incumbent resigned September 1, 1913 to become Governor-General of the Philippines.New member elected November 4, 1913.Democratic hold.
| nowrap | 

|}

See also 
 1912–13 United States Senate elections

References

 
1913